José Carlos Martins Ferreira (born 2 August 1966), known as José Carlos, is a Portuguese retired footballer who played as a right back.

He started his career with Benfica, where he won four major titles, representing four more teams in the Primeira Liga and amassing totals of 364 matches and 15 goals over 15 seasons.

Club career
Born in Lisbon, José Carlos started at local Desportivo Domingos Sávio at age 12, finishing his development at neighbouring S.L. Benfica. In his first two seasons as a professional he did not made a league appearance, as manager John Mortimore favoured António Veloso for the position. He made his debut in a Taça de Portugal match against SL Cartaxo on 18 January 1987, as the season ended in double conquest.

In the summer of 1987, José Carlos was loaned to Portimonense SC, being an undisputed starter during his tenure in Algarve and subsequently returning to Benfica. In the following four years he appeared in 135 competitive games and scored three goals, winning the 1991 national championship, another domestic cup and the 1989 edition of the Supertaça Cândido de Oliveira. He also took part in the final of the 1989–90 European Cup, lost to A.C. Milan.

In 1993, facing competition from Abel Silva and Abel Xavier, José Carlos moved to C.F. Estrela da Amadora, where he reunited with former teammates Edmundo, António Fonseca, Fernando Mendes and Paulinho. He helped his next club, Vitória de Guimarães, to two fourth-place finishes and one third, the latter befalling in the 1997–98 campaign.

José Carlos retired in 2003 at the age of 36, after one year in the top flight with C.F. Os Belenenses and three in the lower leagues with Atlético Clube de Portugal.

International career
José Carlos earned one cap for Portugal, playing the second half of a 1–1 friendly draw with West Germany in Lisbon on 29 August 1990.

Personal life
José Carlos's son, Filipe, was also a footballer. He too represented Belenenses and Atlético. He was also president of APJA (association for amateur footballers), vice-president of SJPF (association for professional footballers) and worked as a pundit for Sport TV.

References

External links
 
 
 

1966 births
Living people
Footballers from Lisbon
Portuguese footballers
Association football defenders
Primeira Liga players
Segunda Divisão players
S.L. Benfica footballers
Portimonense S.C. players
C.F. Estrela da Amadora players
Vitória S.C. players
C.F. Os Belenenses players
Atlético Clube de Portugal players
Portugal youth international footballers
Portugal under-21 international footballers
Portugal international footballers